Day for night is a historic cinematographic technique of shooting night scenes during the day.

Day for Night may also refer to:
Day for Night (festival), an art and music festival hosted in Houston, Texas
Day for Night (film), a 1973 French movie about filmmaking by François Truffaut (originally titled La nuit américaine)
Day for Night (Spock's Beard album), a 1999 album by American progressive rock band Spock's Beard 
Day for Night (The Tragically Hip album), a 1994 album by Canadian rock band The Tragically Hip
Day For Night, a 2005 EP by Australian indie pop band The Bank Holidays
Day for Night, the title of the 2006 Whitney Biennial, an exhibition of contemporary art at the Whitney Museum of American Art in New York City
"Day for Night", a song by English-Irish music duo Moloko from the album Do You Like My Tight Sweater?

See also
Day and Night (disambiguation)